The Adolph Rupp Cup was an award given annually since 2004 to the men's college basketball head coach in NCAA Division I competition "who best exemplifies excellence in his dedication to the game of basketball and to his student athletes." The award is named for former University of Kentucky head coach Adolph Rupp, who compiled an overall record of 876–190 with four recognized national championships and one NIT championship. Rupp coached Kentucky between 1930 and 1972, and his winning percentage of 82.2% is still the NCAA record.

The Rupp Cup was presented by the Commonwealth Athletic Club of Kentucky. The award's inaugural recipient was Phil Martelli of Saint Joseph's University, who was also recognized as the Naismith National Coach of the Year that season. As of 2015, the final winner John Calipari was the only head coach to receive the Rupp Cup twice.

Winners

Winners by school

References

External links
 

College basketball trophies and awards in the United States
Awards established in 2004